Mycetinis is a genus of fungus in the Omphalotaceae family, containing about eight species formerly classified in Marasmius.

General
This group of mushrooms was long known as a section (Alliacei) within the more familiar genus Marasmius, which means that each of the species has a synonym under Marasmius. They are distinguished from other Marasmius by the hymeniform cap skin which consists of smooth cells, with hyphae which do not show a dextrinoid reaction. The species have a characteristic garlic smell.

DNA studies showed that the group is phylogenetically allied more to genus Gymnopus than to Marasmius, but the distinct structure of the cap skin is thought to justify a separation at the genus level. Franklin Sumner Earle had already defined the genus name Mycetinis for this group in 1909, though it had not caught on, and in 2005 Wilson & Desjardin proposed to resurrect this name and redefine it for the current taxonomy. The new phylogenetic classification also means that the group belongs to family Omphalotaceae instead of Marasmiaceae.

A new species, M. curraniae, was described in 2012.

Species

References

 
Omphalotaceae
Agaricales genera